No sports team has ever existed bearing the name Baltimore Browns. However, two sports franchises were named the Browns prior to their respective owners' assuming new team names in Baltimore:

In baseball, the Baltimore Orioles moved from St. Louis, where they were known as the St. Louis Browns.
The Cleveland Browns relocation controversy arose when the owner of the NFL's Cleveland Browns was given a new franchise when he relocated that team's personnel to Baltimore. That team now plays as the Baltimore Ravens.